The Tall Zira'a (or: Tell Zera'a) is an archaeological tell in Jordan. Surveys and geophysical investigations showed the site's great potential for excavations.

Tall Zira´a contains evidence of over 5000 years of settlement – almost without cultural gaps, at the point at which the Syrian cultural sphere meets the Palestinian. Its almost continuous stratigraphy from Early Bronze Age to the Islamic periods can possibly demonstrate the history of northeast Jordan.

The Tall 

It is situated at the confluence of the Wadi el-'Arab and its tributary, the Wadi az-Zahar. The plateau measures  in diameter.

An artesian well is located in the centre of the hill, which used to provide water in abundance, but dried up rapidly in the last years due to excessive pumping by the owners of the surrounding olive tree plantations. The hill is protected by sheer rock faces on its east and north sides.

One terrace is located on the western, the other on the northern base of the tall. Both areas were protected by deep truncations into the Wadi el-'Arab. They served as lower cities near the wadi. However, the north terrace was recently bulldozed for a new olive orchard, and the archaeological remains have thus been seriously disturbed.

Special Importance 
In the Wadi el-'Arab, one can find traces of human activities and settlement places from all periods, dating back to the Paleolithic. Tall Zira'a – the most important site in this area – was used for settlement from the Early Bronze Age up to 1900 CE. It contains evidence of over 5000 years of continuous settlement – almost without large cultural gaps. It means it is possible to observe not only all the different cultural periods in one place, but also the transitions between them.

When Gadara rose to prominence, the tall temporarily stopped being the most important settlement in the region. At the end of the 7th century, however, Gadara declined and the tall became the central settlement once again.

Its importance stems from three facts:

First, its position in an area of fertile soil and surrounded by two freshwater-bearing wadis (Wadi el-'Arab and Wadi az-Zahar).

Second, there is an active freshwater artesian spring on top of the tall. It has been a beneficial and wondrous phenomenon, and a very important factor from a strategic point of view.

Third, the tall's strategic position along an ancient and highly important trade route. The ascent from 290 metres below sea level in the Jordan Valley to the Irbid-Ramtha-area at c. 560 metres above sea level, can be surmounted via the Wadi el-'Arab without steep or narrow passages. This makes the Wadi el-'Arab an ideal route, connecting the trade routes along the Mediterranean via the Jordan valley with Transjordan and, further to the north-east, with Damascus and Mesopotamia. Just as important is the shortcut via Hauran to the east and the centre of Mesopotamia, used since the 5th millennium B.C.

Exploration 
In 1885, Gottlieb Schumacher surveyed the Wadi el-'Arab and mentioned Tall Zira'a. Nelson Glueck visited the Tall Zira'a in 1942. In March 1978, a two-day archaeological rescue investigation was initiated by the Department of Antiquities into the course of the Wadi el-'Arab dam project. In September 1983, this was followed up by a brief archaeological survey supervised by J. W. Hanbury-Tenison in the Wadi el-'Arab.

The 2000s excavations are part of the “Gadara Region Project” – an interdisciplinary study of the regional history of Gadara. In August 2001, a survey on Tall Zira'a and in its surroundings was conducted by the Biblical Archaeological Institute Wuppertal, directed by Dieter Vieweger. In September 2003, he started the first excavation campaign. Since 2004, the project has continued with two campaigns a year as a co-operative project of the Biblical Archaeological Institute Wuppertal and the German Protestant Institute of Archaeology in Amman (since 2006 also Jerusalem), directed by Vieweger and Jutta Häser.

Areas I-III (2003-2008) 

Area I
Natural settings and geophysical investigations showed that the west slope of the tall was a promising site to rapidly expose the stratigraphy of the tall. The youngest Late Bronze Age Level is completely uncovered.

Area II
A second area was opened in spring 2006. It is located on one of the highest points of the plateau and is protected by a steep slope to the north. This prominent position is the most outstanding location on the tall. It was chosen because of its potential for yielding administrative and/or cultic buildings. Up to now a large Roman-Byzantine Dwelling Complex with several building phases was exposed.

Area III
The third excavation area was prepared for test excavation in the south of the tall in 2007. There is a Roman-Byzantine villa rustica (in an oriental version) expected. In a test trench (5 m x 1 m) excavated in 2007, a paved floor of the Roman Villa with a door way, a door hinge stone (out of context) and a water collecting basin near the door way (in situ) came to light. A large cistern (11 m x 6 m x 5.75 m) accessible through a hole in the roof, has already been explored in 2001. Its inner surface is covered by an eight centimetre thick plaster lining.

Summary of the results until spring 2008 
Early Bronze Age
City wall, Test trench on the western slope
Middle Bronze Age
At least two strata, habitation, test trench on the western slope
Late Bronze Age
At least three strata
Middle stratum, 
City wall, water channel - Excavation
Latest stratum 1450–1300 BCE (C14 dated)
Casemate wall, tower with sanctuary, gate, water channels, three residential buildings, two monumental representative building with a hoard of 23+5 cylinder seals, silver pendant, scarabs, beads etc. - Excavation
Iron I	12th–11th century BCE (C14 dated) 
Two large buildings (a "four room house" and a courtyard house) and agricultural activities (silos, huts, stables) - Excavation
Iron II 10th–8th century BCE (C14 dated)
Fortified city, “zigzag wall”, buildings in an agglomerated system, workshops - Excavation
Late Hellenistic-Early Roman
Pits - Excavation
Roman-Byzantine(-Umayyad) 1st–7th century CE
Large, densely inhabited site; Villa rustica; (later) also fortified - Excavation
Middle Islamic
Some houses and agricultural activities-Survey
Late Islamic
Some houses and agricultural activities-Survey
Ottoman
Some houses and agricultural activities-Report of Schumacher

History

Early Bronze Age 
The survey of the tall showed a high concentration of Early Bronze Age pottery in Area I. However, only the outer layer of a massive 2.2 m high Early Bronze Age fortification wall could be excavated in the step trench beyond the Late Bronze Age city wall.

Middle Bronze Age 
So far, the remains of two Middle Bronze Age strata with residential buildings have been uncovered in the same part of Area I, 2 m below the Late Bronze Age casemate wall. Currently it is not possible to say anything definite about the Middle Bronze Age culture before the still unexcavated Late Bronze Age level and further strata have been excavated. It is a unique case in northern Jordan that we have the opportunity to observe the transition from the Middle to the Late Bronze Age culture.

Late Bronze Age 

In the Late Bronze Age (14th–13th century BCE), at least three settlements existed on the tall. For the time being, only the latest Late Bronze Age stratum could be exposed. Several observations indicate that the tall was the centre of a Late Bronze Age city state: The strong fortifications, the massive architecture, the high percentage (5%) of imported pottery from Cyprus and Greece as well as the numerous noteworthy single finds. The most remarkable building of this stratum is the massive casemate wall which fortified the settlement at the north-west flank. A charcoal sample from the collapsed walls gave a radio-carbon date between 1450 and 1300 BCE with 95.4% probability. Six rooms in the case-mate wall could be excavated. Three drainage channels from the residential area end in one of the casemates – originally covered with flat stone slabs. At this point, the water flowed into a semicircular basin from where it drained into a deep, almost circular shaft lined with undressed stones. The three channels substitute an older channel from the middle Late Bronze Age stratum which was covered by the casemates of the city wall of the younger Late Bronze Age stratum. South of the casemate wall a large tower was uncovered. This inward-built tower was divided into two rooms paved with small pebbles. The northern room was connected to the southern part of the casemate wall. It was probably used by the guard. In a later building phase, the southern room was divided by a small wall with two column bases. They probably originally supported wooden columns to carry the roof. A large stone – worked on its base and tapered at the top – found in this room might be a mazzebe (cultic stone). This find and the special layout of the room point to it serving as a small gate sanctuary.

In the spring campaign of 2006, the first domestic structures were found inside the casemate wall. Unlike their Iron Age counterparts, these houses have sizable ground plans. The width of their walls suggests that they possessed a number of floors. To date, three courtyard houses and parts of another two very monumental elaborate buildings north and south of the area have been excavated. On the floor of the monumental building in the north of area I, in an area of one and a half meters by one and a half meters, twenty-three cylinder seals of varying quality and image type were found (in the surroundings five others). It would seem that the seals, together with a silver pendant decorated with a standing figure (5.8 x 3.4 centimeters), a large scarab amulet (3.7 x 2.4 x 1.4 centimeters) and dozens of beads, fell to the ground from a higher surface (a table, cupboard or shelf) during the destruction of the house and were left scattered over the floor. Overall 39 cylinder seals ere found in the Late Bronze Age context, mostly quartz and of the Mitanni stype.

The wealth of the city and its wide-reaching trade links are reflected in the manifold finds of this period (scarabs, terracotta figurines, outstanding bronze objects, a calcite vessel carved with figures of birds, imported faience wares from Egypt include vessels with papyrus images and rings with seals, imported pottery from Cyprus and Mycenaean Greece).

Iron Age I 
The Iron Age I (12th–11th century BCE) settlement displays a very clear change of culture. There are no fortifications for this period. It is obvious that the inhabitants of the Early Iron Age did not create their own settlement pattern, but used the walls of their Late Bronze Age predecessors.
The architecture is very distinctive. On the one hand, the inhabitants of the tall dug several large pits for grain storage, built small walls for stables with some installations and joined simple huts to older walls. On the other hand, an exceptionally large oven made of mud was found in the centre of the area. In addition, there is one larger building with carefully constructed walls, made of two or more rows of undressed stones. Its entrance was paved with stones. Larger areas have to be uncovered before the assumption can be confirmed that this building was either used for administrative purposes or as a residential building for a high-ranking person. And also in the north, a large four room house has been explored in 2008. Two charcoal samples give a radiocarbon dating for this stratum of 1220 to 970 BCE and 1270 to 1040 BCE with 95.4% probability.

Iron Age - or: Biblical Time 
During the Iron Age, Tall Zira'a belonged to the so-called “villages of Jair” (Num 32,39–42; Dtn 3,13–15; Jos 13,29–31 [60 settlements]; Jdc 10,3–5 [30 settlements]; 1 kg 4,13; 1 Chr 2,21–23 [23 settlements]) like Ramoth in Gilead and Kamon. They are located in north Gilead, i.e., between the mountains of Ajlun and the Yarmuk River in Transjordan.

The architecture of the Iron Age IIA/B stratum (10th–8th century BCE) suggests that the tall’s population increased in this period and that the settlement developed an urban character. Even though the fortifications are not as strong as those of the Late Bronze Age, the Iron Age II settlement was protected by a city wall. Various modifications to the houses were made so that two building phases (an early and a late one) can be distinguished. Until now, building remains of the Iron Age II settlement give the impression that the architecture was densely agglomerated. There are not only residential buildings but public buildings as well. The outer walls of the houses are connected to the zigzag-like settlement wall. 
There are several exposed areas that show that the Iron Age houses were separated from one another by a double wall so that the boundaries of buildings and property are clearly visible. 
Three houses and a public area from the earlier phase of Iron Age II have been exposed. 
One of these houses had a workshop area consisting of four longitudinal rooms/courtyards. They yielded interesting finds: a metal furnace with a crucible still in situ in the south-eastern room, and a well-constructed fireplace and work surface in the north-eastern room. In the south-western room a tabun (oven) was discovered, and the north-western part contained some clay loom weights and four more ovens. It is possible that they were used simultaneously. Close to a paved courtyard and another room with three, high column bases made of field stones a large storage vessel and a cultic stone (mazzebe) were found in situ. A radiocarbon sample gave a dating between 1270 and 980 BCE with 95.4% probability. 
The building layout of the later phase of Iron Age II is characterised by an obvious rearrangement of the houses, though not the city wall. In the public area the depot for oil pithoi of the older phase had apparently been closed and the large storage pits changed into a paved courtyard with a massive working stone. A radiocarbon sample from this layer gave a dating between 1120 and 900 BCE with 95.4% probability.
In the northern and the southern squares, the architecture is densely agglomerated. At least four houses have been identified so far. One of them can be identified as a workshop. It was furnished with a bench along the wall and a large cylindrical, very carefully cut limestone workbench (60 cm in diameter). Very close to this stone, a semi-circular stone basin, two ‘industry pots’, a spindle whorl, and an egg-shaped tool of clay were found on the ashy floor.

Late Hellenistic-Early Roman period 
During the Hellenistic-Early Roman period (4th century BCE–1st century CE) Area I was used but not inhabited. It was predominantly utilized for waste disposal facilities. Three large pits had also been dug and carefully lined out with stones for the storage of grain.

Roman-Byzantine period 
The Roman-Byzantine period (2nd–7th century CE) is the uppermost stratum in Area I. Five houses of the Roman-Byzantine period can be distinguished, some of them with elaborate room arrangements. A stone-paved street following the contour line of the slope divided the buildings into a western and an eastern section. 
A thick wall of dressed stones constructed with stretchers and headers, which is visible halfway down the slope to the east of the tall, suggests that the settlement was fortified. In fact, it is possible that the fortification of such a densely inhabited settlement was necessary in the 3rd/4th century when the political situation in Palestine became unstable. Two coins from this stratum have been dated, one to the time of Hadrian (117–138 CE), the second to between 400 and 450 CE.

Islamic period 
The 2001 survey of the tall showed that the settlement on the tall plateau during the Islamic period did not extend across the entire area. Habitation in this period is concentrated in specific places. These will be explored in future years, i.e., the area around the spring (Late Islamic period) and another area on the south-eastern plateau (Middle Islamic period).

Literature 

J. Dijkstra/M. Dijkstra/Vieweger/K. Vriezen: Regionaal Archaeologisch Onderzoek Nabij Umm Qes (Ant. Gadara) De Opgravingen op Tell Zera’a en de Ligging van Laatbrons Gadara, Phoenix 51/1 (2005) 5–26.
J. Häser/D. Vieweger: Preliminary Report on the Archaeological Investigations of the Wadi el-'Arab and the Tall Zira'a, 2003 and 2004, Annual of the Department of Antiquities of Jordan 49 (2005), 135–146.
J. Häser/D. Vieweger: The 'Gadara Region Project' in the Northern Jordan: Spring campaign 2005 on Tall Zar'a, Annual of the Department of Antiquities of Jordan 51 (2007) 9-20.
J. Häser/D. Vieweger: The 'Gadara Region Project' in Northern Jordan. The spring campaign 2006 on Tall Zir'a, Annual of the Département of Antiquities of Jordan 51 (2007) 21-34.
J. Häser/D. Vieweger: Gadara Region Project. Preliminary Report on the Archaeological Excavations on Tall Zira'a in 2005 and 2006, American Journal of Archaeology, 111/3 (2007) 526-530.
C. Steuernagel: Der ’Adschlun, Zeitschrift des Deutschen Palästina-Vereins 49 (1926) 80–83.
D. Vieweger: Der Tell Zera'a im Wadi el-'Arab. Die Region südlich von Gadara. Ein Beitrag zur Methodik des Tell-Surveys, Das Altertum 48 (2003) 191–216.
D. Vieweger/J. Häser: Der Tell Zera'a im Wadi el-'Arab. Das „Gadara Region-Project“ in den Jahren 2001 bis 2004, Zeitschrift des Deutschen Palästina-Vereins 121 (2005a) 1–30.
D. Vieweger/J. Häser: Neueste Entdeckungen auf dem Tell Zera'a (Jordanien), Welt und Umwelt der Bibel (2005b) 62–64.
D. Vieweger/J. Häser: Das „Gadara-Region Project“ – Der Tall Zira'a in den Jahren 2005 und 2006, Zeitschrift des Deutschen Palästina-Vereins 123 (2007) 1-27.
D. Vieweger/J. Häser: “… sixty great cities with walls and bronze bars…”. 5000 Years of Palestinian History on One Settlement Mound, Near Eastern Archaeology, 70/3 (2007) 147-167.

See also
Cities of the Ancient Near East

References

External links
Links to the current excavation:
 Biblical Archaeological Institute Wuppertal
 German Protestant Institute of Archaeology, Research Unit of the German Archaeological Institute
 Page of the children's book The mystery of the tall

Archaeological sites in Jordan
Canaanite cities
Bronze Age Asia
Iron Age Asia
Bronze Age sites
Iron Age sites in Asia
Former populated places in Southwest Asia
Zira'a